Dalibor Svrčina was the defending champion but lost in the final to Sebastian Ofner.

Ofner won the title after defeating Svrčina 6–0, 6–4 in the final which was characterized by bad rainy weather to the point it was interrupted on 4–0 in favor of Ofner and concluded on indoor hard courts.

Seeds

Draw

Finals

Top half

Bottom half

References

External links
Main draw
Qualifying draw

Sparta Prague Open - 1
2022 Singles